Iren Nigg (born 1955), is a Liechtenstein writer. She travelled widely before studying journalism at the University of Fribourg in Switzerland. She first started publishing short works of fiction in literary magazines, and published her first book Fieberzeit in 1988.
Her second book Man wortet sich die Orte selbst appeared in 2006; it won the EU Prize for Literature. She has also published numerous short pieces.

References

	 

1955 births
Liechtenstein writers
Liechtenstein women writers
Living people
20th-century women writers
20th-century writers
21st-century women writers